Lugari is a town in Kakamega County in the former Western Province of Kenya. Until 2010, it was the capital of the former Lugari District. The town is located 10 kilometres east of Webuye. Lugari has an urban population of 5000 
Lugari has two constituencies: likuyani under honourable enoch Kibunguchi and Lugari under honourable Ayub Savula.(1999 census ).

Kakamega County
Populated places in Western Province (Kenya)